Darcy Vescio (born 3 August 1993) is an Australian rules footballer playing for the Carlton Football Club in the AFL Women's competition. As a heavily marketed marquee player, Vescio has been referred to as a "household name" in Australia by ESPN.

Junior and state league football
Vescio began playing football with their brother at the age of five. Vescio was a participant in the Auskick program. They stopped playing competitive football at the age of fourteen, when they were no longer allowed to play with the youth boys team.

Vescio started playing again at the age of eighteen, when they moved to Melbourne from their home town of Wangaratta and joined the Darebin Falcons in the Victorian Women's Football League (VWFL). They won four premierships with the club in consecutive seasons from 2013 to 2016, and won the Lisa Hardeman Medal for best on ground performances in two of these matches in 2015 and 2016.

Vescio has represented Victoria at the AFL Women's National Championship in 2013 and 2015.

In 2018, Vescio played VFLW with the Carlton Football Club and won the club's best and fairest. In the final round of the season, Vescio kicked 9 goals to claim the league's leading goal kicking award.

AFL Women's career
They made their debut in round 1, 2017, in the club and the league's inaugural match at IKON Park against . They kicked a game-high four goals in the match, which was more than Collingwood's overall team score. This was acknowledged by the AFL Players Association, highlighting Vescio as Player of the Week.

At the conclusion of the 2017 season, Vescio was the AFLW leading goalkicker, was nominated by their teammates for the AFLW Players’ Most Valuable Player Award, and was listed in the 2017 All-Australian team. Their mark in front of goal in round five against  was voted by fans as Mark of the Year.

Carlton signed Vescio for the 2018 season during the trade period in May 2017. They played in all seven of Carlton's matches that season and kicked five goals, tying Tayla Harris and sharing the club's leading goalkicker award with her.

For the 2019 season, Vescio was elevated to the leadership group alongside Shae Audley, Kerryn Harrington and Sarah Hosking, with Bri Davey serving as captain and Katie Loynes as vice-captain.

Vescio was awarded with their second All-Australian blazer, named on the interchange bench. Vescio achieved selection in Champion Data's 2021 AFLW All-Star stats team, after leading the league for goals in the 2021 AFL Women's season, totalling 1.8 a game.

Statistics
 Statistics are correct to the end of the 2021 season'

|- style="background-color: #EAEAEA"
! scope="row" style="text-align:center" | 2017
|
| 3 || 7 || bgcolor=FA8072 | 14§ || 4 || 39 || 11 || 50 || 13 || 18 || bgcolor=FA8072 | 2.0§ || 0.6 || 5.6 || 1.6 || 7.1 || 1.9 || 2.6 || 7
|-
| scope="row" text-align:center | 2018
| 
| 3 || 7 || 5 || 6 || 38 || 9 || 47 || 5 || 17 || 0.7 || 0.9 || 5.4 || 1.3 || 6.7 || 0.7 || 2.4 || 0
|- style="background-color: #EAEAEA"
! scope="row" style="text-align:center" | 2019
|
| 3 || 9 || 5 || 10 || 50 || 31 || 81 || 17 || 13 || 0.6 || 1.1 || 5.6 || 3.4 || 9.0 || 1.9 || 1.4 || 0
|-
| scope="row" text-align:center | 2020
| 
| 3 || 7 || 3 || 1 || 50 || 26 || 76 || 16 || 15 || 0.4 || 0.1 || 7.1 || 3.7 || 10.9 || 2.3 || 2.1 || 0
|- style="background-color: #EAEAEA"
! scope="row" style="text-align:center" | 2021
|
| 3 || 9 || bgcolor=FA8072 | 16§ || 4 || 56 || 26 || 82 || 28 || 16 || bgcolor=FA8072 | 1.8§ || 0.4 || 6.2 || 2.9 || 9.1 || 3.1 || 1.8 || 
|- class="sortbottom"
! colspan=3| Career
! 39
! 44
! 27
! 233
! 103
! 336
! 79
! 79
! 1.1
! 0.7
! 6.0
! 2.6
! 8.6
! 2.0
! 2.0
! 7
|}

Personal life
Vescio previously worked part-time at the Carlton Football Club as a graphic designer. They were responsible for designing the club's inaugural women's guernsey and pride guernsey.

They were born and raised in the Victorian town of Markwood near Wangaratta and attended school at Wangaratta High School. Vescio is of Italian and Chinese heritage and is an AFL Multicultural Ambassador.

In 2018, the Carlton Football Club made a documentary, Bloodlines: Darcy Vescio'', which focused on Vescio's dual heritage.

On 29 December 2021, Vescio publicly came out as non-binary and announced the decision to change their gender pronouns to they/them, expressing that "[s]haring this feels a bit daunting but brings me a lot of warmth and happiness".

References

External links

1993 births
Living people
All-Australians (AFL Women's)
Australian graphic designers
Australian people of Chinese descent
Australian people of Italian descent
Australian rules footballers from Victoria (Australia)
Carlton Football Club (AFLW) players
Darebin Falcons players
Non-binary sportspeople
People from Wangaratta
Sportswomen from Victoria (Australia)